Amateur Porn Star Killer is an American horror film series, currently consisting of three films. Created by Shane Ryan, the original film was theatrically released in 2007.

First film 
The first chapter of the series is a mockumentary about a snuff film shot, mainly consisting in a confrontation between the director of the snuff (played by the same Shane Ryan) and his 13-years-old victim (Michiko Jimenez). According to Ryan, it was filmed in one weekend. The film received mixed reviews. According to the book From the Arthouse to the Grindhouse, the film is "a postmodern take on the transgressive reality film, using the genre's format as a position from which to critique it". DVD Verdict's critic Gordon Sullivan panned the film, writing that it could be interesting as a 15-minute short, and referring to it as "boring" and lacking both "a competent audiovisual scheme and a compelling narrative".

Sequels 
The other chapters of the film reprise the scheme of the first film, with just two actors (the snuff director and the victim) on scene. About the second film, according to the Film Threat review, "Ryan has, once again, created something bound to raise eyebrows and the ire of morality police everywhere. He makes no apologies for it, and he does it so well that if you go into the film with an open mind you can’t help but be impressed by how good a job he’s done."

The final chapter of the film features the real pornstar Regan Reese as main actress. It was filmed in 3D. While the previous two films were shot in motel rooms, this was set in the front seat of a SUV.

References

Further reading
 Steve Jones, Torture Porn: Popular Horror after Saw, pp. 175–183, Palgrave Macmillan, 2013. .

External links

2000s mockumentary films
American mockumentary films
Film series introduced in 2007
English-language films
Horror film series
Films about pornography
Films about snuff films